George William McNeill Jr. (born October 2, 1975) is an American professional golfer. He is a two-time winner on the PGA Tour with victories at the 2007 Frys.com Open and the 2012 Puerto Rico Open.

Biography
McNeill was born and raised in Naples, Florida. He attended North Fort Myers High School and graduated in 1993.  He then attended Florida State University, where he was a member of the golf team. He was an All-ACC and All-America selection in 1997 and 1998.

McNeill is currently a member of the PGA Tour. He was a member of the Nationwide Tour in 2003 but did not retain his card. In 2004 he played on the Golden Bear Tour and he only played in one Nationwide Tour event. In 2005 he played several mini-tour events and tried to Monday qualify for several Nationwide and PGA Tour events, but was unsuccessful. In late 2005, he took a break from professional golf and worked as an assistant professional at the Shadow Wood and Forest Country Clubs in Fort Myers, Florida for six months. In June 2006, he returned to professional golf by qualifying for the 2006 U.S. Open.  He followed the U.S. Open with two Nationwide event starts, making one cut. Later in December 2006, he was medalist at the PGA Tour Qualifying Tournament. By doing so, he won $50,000 and received his PGA Tour card for 2007. As a rookie on the PGA Tour in 2007, he qualified for the FedEx Cup. He played in two FedEx Cup events before missing the points cut for the third event. He won his first PGA Tour event during the Fall Series at the Frys.com Open in October. McNeill won the 2012 Puerto Rico Open for his second PGA Tour victory. Tied for the lead with Ryo Ishikawa with three holes to play, McNeill finished with three birdies for a two-shot win. He finished runner-up to Ángel Cabrera in the 2014 Greenbrier Classic after shooting a 9-under-par 61 in the final round.  He finished the tournament with a score of 14-under to Cabrera's 16-under. He found out after the tournament that his older sister had died of cancer earlier that day.

Amateur wins (1)
1997 Tennessee Tournament of Champions

Professional wins (6)

PGA Tour wins (2)

PGA Tour playoff record (0–2)

Other wins (4)
1999 Citronelle Classic (Emerald Coast Tour)
2001 Waterloo Open Golf Classic
2005 Becks / Coors Light Open
2008 Becks / Coors Light Open

Results in major championships

CUT = missed the half-way cut
"T" = tied

See also
2006 PGA Tour Qualifying School graduates
List of Florida State Seminoles men's golfers

References

External links

American male golfers
Florida State Seminoles men's golfers
PGA Tour golfers
Golfers from Florida
Sportspeople from Naples, Florida
Sportspeople from Fort Myers, Florida
1975 births
Living people